Spider is a British musical children's television mini-series made by Hibbert Ralph Entertainment for the BBC, that was originally aired on BBC One from 26 September to 30 December 1991. It followed the adventures of a spider, the protagonist, and a young boy (although the boy was only present in eleven of the thirteen episodes).

The stories were told through song, and performed by Jeff Stevenson with his children, Casey and Holly, singing backing vocals. The styles of music featured in the episodes vary from rock 'n roll to haunting and melancholic tunes, and were produced by Rick Cassman at Triple X Studios. A BBC video entitled Spider! – I'm Only Scary 'cos I'm Hairy! (BBCV 4753), which contained all thirteen episodes, was also released in 1992. It was re-released on DVD in 2004.

Reception
Spider was generally well received by critics and viewers, with praise directed to the series' simple animation, music, humour and multi-generational appeal. Spider! has an 8.2 rating from 44 IMDb users as of November 2016. Spider has now attracted a cult following on old children's videos and DVDs. Several episodes have also been uploaded to video networking sites like YouTube and Veoh.

The series has been repeated on various children's television channels in the United Kingdom, such as CBeebies and Nick Jr. It was also dubbed into Scottish Gaelic as Damhan Allaidh and shown on BBC Two Scotland in the mornings. In the United States, the series was broadcast with American voice actors on Cartoon Network and repeated until 2000.

In Australia, the series was played on the ABC for two years from 1993 to 1994 and then on digital television on ABC2 from 2005 to 2006. In Namibia, the series was shown on NBC, and first aired on the network in 1992, as part of its lineup of children's programmes during the holidays.

In Canada, the series was broadcast on cable television on its networks for Knowledge Network in British Columbia and YTV (as part of YTV Jr.) in all states and territories and on digital television on BBC Kids. In New Zealand, the series aired on the defunct channel TVNZ 6 as part of Kidzone, a block for preschoolers. The series has also been sold to Hong Kong and was screened on ATV.

There were also two pop-up books, based on the first and tenth episodes, adapted from Richard Warner's original songs by Ron van der Meer and illustrated by the director Graham Ralph.

On 12 May 2005, Silver Fox Films announced it was developing a new, revived version of the series entitled Spider's Silly Show. The format was to be extended from five minutes to eleven minutes, and fifty two episodes were planned. It was to be presented by Andrew Sachs, who had previously narrated William's Wish Wellingtons for Hibbert Ralph Entertainment. However, the project appears to have been abandoned, as the latest information on it dates from 2005, and it has still not appeared on television.

Episodes
The first twelve episodes were all broadcast on BBC One as part of the Children's BBC strand on Thursdays at 3:50pm (a puppet spider named "Ninja" also joined Simon Parkin, Andi Peters and Edd the Duck in The Broom Cupboard during the original run), but the first programme of 21 November 1991 was Ready, Teddy, Go! (a lead up to the year's telethon of Pudsey), so
the ninth episode was not transmitted until 28 November (the ninth episode of Ragdoll Productions' Brum was also not broadcast until that day as well).

The last Thursday of the year was 26 December, Boxing Day, so the thirteenth and final episode was not broadcast until four days thereafter, on Monday 30 December at 4:05pm.

In addition to being repeated by itself onwards from 1992, the series was also repeated as part of Ants in Your Pants (which was hosted by Edd the Duck's second replacement after "Ratz", Otis the Aardvark) in 1995, and the chorus of the first episode could also be heard in EastEnders episodes from this time period during scenes where children of Walford sat in front of a television.

References

External links
 

1990s British animated television series
1990s British children's television series
1991 British television series debuts
1991 British television series endings
BBC children's television shows
English-language television shows
British children's animated musical television series
Television series about spiders
CBeebies